The 2009 Special Olympics World Winter Games was held in the state of Idaho, USA from February 7 through February 13, 2009.

Nearly 2,500 athletes from over 100 countries participated in the games. Dignitaries included actors, musicians, athletes and politicians from around the United States and the world. Vice President Joe Biden presented awards to athletes, and met athletes and their families at other events on Thursday, February 12. He further announced the appointment of Kareem Dale as special assistant to the president for disability policy.

The following cities in Idaho hosted the games:
Boise
McCall
Sun Valley

Venues 
Snowshoeing – McCall (Ponderosa State Park)
Floor Hockey – Boise (Expo Idaho)
Alpine Skiing – Boise (Bogus Basin Ski Resort)
Figure Skating – Boise (Qwest Arena)
Short track – Boise (Idaho Ice World)
Cross-country Skiing – Sun Valley (Sun Valley Nordic Center)
Snowboarding – Sun Valley (Dollar Mountain)

External links 
 Flame of Hope
 Morley the Mascot
 Let Me Be Brave Documentary produced by Idaho Public Television

References 

Special Olympics
Special Olympics World Winter Games
Special Olympics World Winter Games
Special Olympics World Winter Games
Special Olympics World Winter Games
Special Olympics World Winter Games
Sports in Boise, Idaho